I'm with Busey was a television show in the comedy and documentary which aired on Comedy Central in the summer of 2003. It revolved around a young writer named Adam de la Peña, who met and befriended his childhood idol, actor Gary Busey.

Although the show lasted for only one season and the popularity of the show was limited, it has developed a cult following in the years after its cancellation.



Series description 

The premise of the show revolved around the idea of Gary Busey teaching Adam de la Peña all about the world. In one episode, for example, de la Peña complained to Busey about his lack of a love life. Busey helped de la Peña become more confident by setting him up with a date and then feeding him lines through an earpiece. During that episode, Busey told Adam to tell the girl that he had "a Loch Ness monster in his pants."

Much of the humor revolved around Busey-isms, short statements that Busey would give about the world around him. For example: "Fear is the dark room where the devil develops his negatives." After such a phrase, the camera would cut to de la Peña's confused reaction, or to one of his short, confessional-style monologues.

In the first episode, Busey told one of his most perplexing Buseyisms: "try" meaning "tomorrow's really yesterday". Busey explained that when you say you'll "try", you're really just lying to yourself, having already decided in your mind that you're never going to attempt that which you claim you'll "try". Thus, all the poor decisions you made yesterday, you'll continue to make tomorrow. de la Peña went full circle in the last episode of the series, using the "try" Buseyism on another young writer whom Busey had started mentoring after de la Peña began hanging out with Andy Dick.

The show made an effort to appear to be as completely real as possible. However, it was later revealed that much of the show was improvisation. Busey and de la Peña would agree on a scene's contents, and then improvise their lines. The show became increasingly bizarre as it went on, reflecting either a conscious decision by the actors to gradually let the audience into that world, or greater familiarity with the concept. This was clued at a few times by how bizarre Busey became towards the end of the show, whether it be sticking plugs into cows' anuses (to prevent methane expulsion and global warming) or traveling to an electronics store and remarking that a digital camera could one day be engineered to kill de la Peña's mother. Busey appeared to enjoy spoofing of himself, playing on the public perception that he had lost his mind following the 1988 motorcycle accident that had nearly killed him.

Many of these Busey-isms would later be repeated during Busey's appearances on VH1's Celebrity Fit Club.

Episodes 

Each episode is organized around a particular topic, either of Adam's or Gary's choosing.

External links 

 
 

Comedy Central original programming
2000s American mockumentary television series
2003 American television series debuts
2003 American television series endings
English-language television shows